Array Collective is the alias of 11 Belfast-based artists and activists. In 2021 they became the first Northern Irish winners of the Turner Prize.

Work 
Array Collective are known for projects that support "gay rights, marriage equality, feminism, reproductive rights and anti-austerity activism". The Turner Prize judges commended the group for their work to "inspire social change through art" and "working collaboratively with local communities".

Array Collective's activities have included placard-making workshops and participating in activist events and demonstrations with elaborate costumes and props.

The Druithaib’s Ball 
The Druithaib’s Ball - for which they were nominated for the Turner Prize - has had two forms to date. The first was an event held at the Black Box venue in Belfast in 2021. The event was conceived as "a wake for the centenary of Ireland’s partition", "which involved a phantasmagoria of performances, stories and wild costumes bringing a carnivalesque lightness to an often dark, difficult and divided political backdrop". A second iteration of the work was installed at the 2021-22 Turner exhibition held in Coventry during its year as UK City of Culture. The installation took the form of an immersive síbín space [anglicised spelling shebeen] or a “pub without permission”, filled with banners, photographs, ashtrays, and snacks. A film of the Black Box event was shown in the síbín installation. The group imagined the space as “a place to gather outside the sectarian divides”, in reference to the historic conflict between Irish Catholics and Protestants.
The performers of "The Druithaib's Ball" event and subsequent installation are Vasiliki Stasinaki, Richard O’Leary, Cleamairí Feirste, Phillip Hession, Méabh Meir and Rosa Tralee.

Array's nomination and their Turner installation had a mixed critical reception. The White Pube review notes that "The whole room takes a jumble of things: queer aesthetics, performance, drag and activist aesthetics (and all the loaded meaning and weighty content that comes with them) as its main vocabulary, all in its true and messiest sense [...] The resulting work is palpable and urgent; it made me want to scream, but in a good way". The Guardian's art critic Jonathan Jones questioned the "aesthetic achievement" of the installation while noting how it represented the "work of people who deploy their gifts in useful ways far from London galleries".

The Druithaib's Ball came to viral prominence in early 2022 when TikTok content creator @itsreefa uploaded an 8-second long video entitled, "Welcome to Coventry "  on 12 January. The video's verbal exchange between the user and an artist in the street became a widely used TikTok sound for its wholesome and absurd delivery: "What's this?"/ "It's an art project."/"OK, I like it. Picasso. That way." As of 5 April 2022, the video has been viewed 46.7M times, and its original audio has been used by over 200K users, amassing around 989M views in total. Some days after the video's viral visibility, the artist in the video was confirmed to be Druithaib's Ball performer Rosa Tralee, carrying out a re-staging of their performance on the final day of the Herbert Gallery's Turner Prize exhibition.

Members 
Array Collective are Sighle Bhreathnach-Cashell, Sinead Bhreathnach-Cashell, Jane Butler, Emma Campbell, Alessia Cargnelli, Mitch Conlon, Clodagh Lavelle, Grace McMurray, Stephen Millar, Laura O'Connor, Thomas Wells. Campbell and Cargnelli are completing PhD study at Ulster University, and O'Connor, Bhreathnach-Cashell, Butler, Lavelle and Millar are all Ulster alumni.

Awards and accolades 
2021: Winners of the Turner Prize, with runners-up: Black Obsidian Sound System, Cooking Sections, Gentle/Radical and Project Art Works. The Selecter frontwoman Pauline Black presented Array Collective with the award at Coventry Cathedral. They collected the award with three of the members’ children in attendance.

Exhibitions and installations 
2021-2022: The Turner Prize exhibition at The Herbert, Coventry, 29 September 2021 – 12 January 2022. Array Collective also added an etching of The Druithaib's Ball into the Gallery 2 displays at The Herbert.

October - December 2019: an installation 'As Others See Us' and a symposium 'If You Don't Play the Game, Don't Make the Rules' at Jerwood Collaborate! London.

References

External links 

 Array Collective's website http://www.arraystudiosbelfast.com/array-collective.html

Irish artists
Artists from Belfast
Living people
Culture in Belfast
Art in Northern Ireland
Arts organisations based in Northern Ireland
British artist groups and collectives
Turner Prize winners
Year of birth missing (living people)